And I Thought About You may refer to:

 And I Thought About You (Patti Page album), 1955
 And I Thought About You (Johnny Hartman album), 1959